Junge Junge is a German producer duo made up of DJs Michael Noack and Rochus Grolle. Mainly producing electronic dance music since 2006, they are signed to Universal Music Sweden and Island Records releasing their EP Beautiful Girl on July 15, 2016.

Discography

EPs
2016: Beautiful Girl

Singles
2013: "Why" (Rochus Grolle & Michael Noack feat. Alex Landon)
2015: "Beautiful Girl" 
2016: "Run Run Run" 
2017: "I Don't Love You (I'm Just Lonely)"
2017: "I'm The One"
2018: "Catch 22" (feat. Valentijn)
2018: "Make You Feel Like" 
Remixes
2015: Charlie Puth - "One Call Away"
2016: Aka Aka & Thalstroem feat. Chasing Kurt - "True"
2016: Charlie Puth feat. Selena Gomez - "We Don't Talk Anymore"
2017: Kyle Pierce - "Tick Tock"
2018: Vargas & Lagola - "Roads"

References

External links
Official website
Facebook

German DJs
German record producers
Electronic dance music DJs